Arville Irving Levorsen (1894–1965) was an American geologist. He served as the dean of the School of Mineral Sciences at Stanford University.

References

External links 
Wallace E. Pratt. "Memorial to Arville Irving Levorsen". AAPG Bulletin, 1966.

1894 births
1965 deaths
Stanford University people
20th-century American geologists
Presidents of the Geological Society of America